William Fitzhugh Brundage is an American historian, and William Umstead Distinguished Professor, at University of North Carolina. His works focus on white and black historical memory in the American South since the Civil War.

Early life
Brundage graduated from the University of Chicago with an MA in 1984, and from Harvard University with an MA and Ph.D, in 1988.

Career
Brundage taught at Queen's University at Kingston, and University of Florida. He teaches at University of North Carolina at Chapel Hill, where he is the William Umstead Distinguished Professor in the History department.

Brundage is the author and editor of a number of books. He won the Merle Curti Award from the Organization of American Historians in 1994 for Lynching in the New South: Georgia and Virginia, 1880–1930.

He is a Guggenheim Fellow.

Works

 
 
 

 Introduction to Remembering Reconstruction: Struggles over the Meaning of America's Most Turbulent Era, Louisiana State University Press, 2017

References

External links
 Official website
 UNC website

Living people
University of North Carolina at Chapel Hill faculty
Harvard University alumni
21st-century American historians
21st-century American male writers
1959 births
University of Chicago alumni
Academic staff of the Queen's University at Kingston
University of Florida faculty
American male non-fiction writers